IAE may refer to:
Institut d'Administration des Entreprises, graduate schools of management in France
International Aero Engines
IAE Universidad Austral, the Management and Business School of the Universidad Austral
 Spanish Institute of Actuaries
 Ignalina Nuclear Power Plant
 Inside American Education, a 1992 book by economist Thomas Sowell about education in the United States
 International Association of Egyptologists
 "In any event".

IAe may refer to :
 Indonesian Aerospace, an Indonesian aerospace company